Dāvis Indrāns (born 6 June 1995) is a Latvian football player. He plays for FK Jelgava.

International
He made his debut for the Latvia national football team on 9 June 2017 in a World Cup qualifier group game against Portugal.

References

External links
 
 

1995 births
Footballers from Riga
Living people
Latvian footballers
Latvia youth international footballers
Latvia under-21 international footballers
Latvia international footballers
FK Ventspils players
Skonto FC players
FS METTA/Latvijas Universitāte players
FK RFS players
FK Jelgava players
Latvian Higher League players
Association football midfielders